Watkinson is a surname of English origin. At the time of the British Census of 1881 Watkinson Surname at Forebears, its frequency was highest in Nottinghamshire (4.1 times the British average), followed by Cambridgeshire, Derbyshire, Yorkshire, Lancashire, Suffolk, Lincolnshire, Essex and Cheshire. The name Watkinson may apply to:

Surname
Angela Watkinson (born 1941), British politician
Carolyn Watkinson (born 1949), British baroque singer
Colin Watkinson, British cinematographer
David Watkinson (born 1954), British rugby league player
Dr. Ernest A. Watkinson (1912–2011), Canadian physician, diplomat, and public health advocate
Eddie Watkinson (born 1979), American artist
Harold Watkinson (1910–1995), British businessman and politician, the only Viscount Watkinson
Lee Watkinson (born 1966), American poker player
Murray Watkinson (1939–2004), New Zealand rower, brother of Peter Watkinson
Mike Watkinson (born 1961), English cricketer
Peter Watkinson, New Zealand rower, brother of Murray Watkinson
William Watkinson "Billy" (1922–2001), English footballer
William Watkinson (jockey) "Willie" (1886–1926), Tasmanian jockey, winning rider of Jack Horner at the 1926 Grand National

See also 
 Watkins (surname)

English-language surnames